Donbassaero (Russian: Донбассаэро) was an airline with its head office on the property of Donetsk International Airport in Donetsk, Ukraine. It operated domestic and international scheduled services. Its main bases were Donetsk International Airport and Boryspil International Airport in Kyiv. The main shareholder of the company was PrivatBank, controlled by Ihor Kolomoyskyi.

History
The airline was founded in 1993 as Donetsk State Airline, then re-organized and re-branded as Donbassaero in 2003.  Their website was launched in July 2005 and their online booking system started in November of the same year.

Since 25 March 2012, as a result of the Anti-monopoly committee of Ukraine's decision to allow the consolidation of the Ukrainian Aviation Group's physical and operational assets, Donbassaero no longer operated flights with its own code, but rather on behalf of its parent company Aerosvit.

The airline filed for bankruptcy and ceased operations on 14 January 2013.

Destinations
Donbassaero served the following scheduled destinations (as of January 2013):

 Armenia
 Yerevan - Zvartnots International Airport
 Azerbaijan
 Baku - Heydar Aliyev International Airport
 Cyprus
 Larnaca - Larnaca International Airport
 Georgia
 Tbilisi - Tbilisi International Airport
 Greece
 Athens - Athens International Airport
 Lithuania
 Vilnius - Vilnius International Airport
 Russia
 Moscow - Domodedovo International Airport.
 Sweden
 Stockholm - Stockholm International Airport
 Syria
 Aleppo - Aleppo International Airport
 Turkey
 Istanbul - Atatürk International Airport
 United Arab Emirates
 Dubai - Dubai International Airport
 Ukraine
 Donetsk - Sergey Prokofiev International Airport hub
 Kharkiv - Kharkiv International Airport
 Kyiv - Boryspil International Airport hub
 Odesa - Odesa International Airport

Fleet

The Donbassaero fleet included the following aircraft (as of December 2012):

References

External links

 Official website
 Official website 
 Donbassaero Fleet Photos

Defunct airlines of Ukraine
Airlines established in 2003
Airlines disestablished in 2013
Companies based in Donetsk
Privat Group
2003 establishments in Ukraine
2013 disestablishments in Ukraine